Carmila railway station is located on the North Coast line in Queensland, Australia. It serves the town of Carmila. Opposite the single platform lie a crossing loop and siding.

Services
Carmila is served by Traveltrain's Spirit of Queensland service.

References

External links

Carmila station Queensland's Railways on the Internet

Buildings and structures in Central Queensland
Regional railway stations in Queensland
North Coast railway line, Queensland